The Western Financial Place (formerly known as the Cranbrook Recreational Complex) is a 4,268-seat (plus 352 standing room) arena and an aquatics centre which is located in East Kootenay Cranbrook, British Columbia.  Western Financial Place is a multi-purpose recreational facility. The arena is a standardised National Hockey League size rink at 200 feet long and 85 feet wide.

It was built in 2000 and it has hosted many events and concerts since its opening. It serves as an arena for the Vancouver Canucks practice sessions, a Superdogs show, monster truck shows, a number of Champions of Skating performances and the Husky Skate the Nation performances.  It also was home to the Kootenay Ice WHL major junior ice hockey team.

The arena has been the host of two circus groups. The Circus Gatti and Cirque Sublime performed their show "Adamo" here.

Closure and reopening 

Due to the COVID-19 pandemic the complex was forced to close in March, 2020 due to the restrictions put in place by the provincial government of British Columbia. It was announced that the complex would reopen on November 2, 2020 with strict access rules and a number of facility changes to accommodate restrictions.

During the closure, the City of Cranbrook budgeted $3.55 million for the reconstruction of the roof and arena upgrades. The construction process was carried out under COVID-19 protocols and without the general public.

References

External links
 Western Financial Place

British Columbia Hockey League arenas
Indoor ice hockey venues in Canada
Indoor arenas in British Columbia
Sports venues in British Columbia
Western Hockey League arenas
Cranbrook, British Columbia
2000 establishments in British Columbia
Sports venues completed in 2000